Karl Stieler (December 15, 1842 in Munich, Germany – April 12, 1885 in Munich) was a German lawyer and author.

Life

Stieler was the son of the painter Joseph Karl Stieler and his wife, the poet Josephine von Miller.

After graduating from school, he studied law at the University of Munich.  He later transferred to the University of Heidelberg, where he earned his PhD in 1869.

He subsequently worked as a lawyer for about a year, but abandoned that career in favour of extensive travel through Great Britain, France, Switzerland, Belgium, Italy, and Hungary.

Stieler returned to Munich to settle down, where he quickly became acquainted with fellow writers Paul Heyse and Emanuel Geibel; these two introduced him into the Munich literary circle  (The Crocodiles).

In 1882, Stieler was promoted to Archive Assessor of the Bavarian Public Records Office in Munich. He died of pneumonia there, at the age of 43, on April 12, 1885.

The community of  commissioned the sculptor Thomas Dennerlein to create a memorial for Stieler.

Works 
 Aus deutschen Bergen (1871)
 Aus Fremde und Heimat (1886)
 Bergbleamln (1865)
 Durch Krieg zum Frieden (1886)
 Elsaß-Lothringen (1877)
 Habt's a Schneid? (1877)
 Hochlandlieder (1879)
 A Hochzeit in de Berg (1884)
 In der Sommerfrisch (1883)
 Italien (1875)
 Kulturbilder aus Bayern (1885)
 Natur- und Lebensbilder aus den Alpen (1886)
 Neue Hochlandlieder (1883)
 Rheinfahrt (1877)
 Um Sunnawend''' (1878)
 Wanderzeit (1882)
 Aus der Hütten (1887)
 Weidmanns Erinnerungen (1871)
 Weil's mi freut! (1876)
 Winteridyll (1885)

References

 Pikola, Rudolf: Karl Stieler'' : seine Zeit, seine Familie, sein Werk. - Hausham : Fuchs, 1985

1842 births
1885 deaths
19th-century German writers
19th-century German male writers
Writers from Munich